Patriarch Athanasius III may refer to:

 Patriarch Athanasius III of Alexandria (ruled 1276–1316) 
 Athanasius III Dabbas (1647–1724)